The McKean site is an archaeological site in Crook County, Wyoming, United States.  A premier site of the Great Plains hunting cultures, it is the namesake of the "McKean Complex."  Two significant contemporary sites of the same culture are Signal Butte in Nebraska and the LoDaisKa site in Colorado.

In 1991, the McKean site was listed on the National Register of Historic Places.

References

Further reading
 Mulloy, W.T. 1953. A Preliminary Historical Outline for the Northwestern Plains. Chicago: Ill. University of Chicago. 
 Smithsonian Institution, and R.P. Wheeler. 1951. Appraisal of the Archeological and Paleontological Resources of the Keyhole Reservoir, Crook County, Wyoming. Washington, D.C.: The Smithsonian Institution.
 Wheeler, R.P. 1995. Archeological Investigations in Three Reservoir Areas in South Dakota and Wyoming. Lincoln, Neb.: J & L Reprint Co.

External links
 McKean Archaeological Site
 University of Wyoming Outstanding Former Faculty
 Wyoming Anthropological Museum
 University of Wyoming

McKean Site
Archaeological sites on the National Register of Historic Places in Wyoming
Geography of Crook County, Wyoming
National Register of Historic Places in Crook County, Wyoming